Maid of Salem is a 1937 film made by Paramount Pictures, directed by Frank Lloyd, and starring Claudette Colbert and Fred MacMurray.

Plot
It tells the story of a young girl in Salem, Massachusetts, 1692, who has an affair with an adventurer. She is sentenced  as a witch, but saved by him.

Cast

Reception
Writing for The Spectator in 1937, Graham Greene gave the film a mildly positive review, describing the dialogue as "pompously period", but praising the story as one allowing for "a little authentic horror [] to creep in".

References

External links

1937 films
Paramount Pictures films
1930s English-language films
American historical drama films
American black-and-white films
Films directed by Frank Lloyd
1937 drama films
1930s historical drama films
Films scored by Victor Young
Films set in Massachusetts
Films set in the 1690s
Films set in the Thirteen Colonies
Drama films based on actual events
Salem witch trials in fiction
1930s American films